Eutychianus:
 Pope Eutychian (275–283)
 Flavius Eutychianus, Roman consul in 398
 Eutychianus of Adana, 6th century writer